This article shows the roster of all participating teams at the 2019 FIVB Volleyball Women's Nations League. The 16 national teams involved in the tournament were required to register a squad of 21 players, which every week's 14-player roster must be selected from. Each country must declare its 14-player roster two days before the start of each week's round-robin competition.

The following is the Belgian roster in the 2019 FIVB Volleyball Women's Nations League 

Head coach: Gert Vande Broek

The following is the Brazilian roster in the 2019 FIVB Volleyball Women's Nations League 

Head coach: José Roberto Guimarães

The following is the Bulgarian roster in the 2019 FIVB Volleyball Women's Nations League 

Head coach: Ivan Petkov

The following is the Chinese roster in the 2019 FIVB Volleyball Women's Nations League 

Head coach: Lang Ping

The following is the Dominican roster in the 2019 FIVB Volleyball Women's Nations League 

Head coach:  Marcos Kwiek

The following is the German roster in the 2019 FIVB Volleyball Women's Nations League 

Head coach: Felix Koslowski

The following is the Italian roster in the 2019 FIVB Volleyball Women's Nations League 

Head coach: Davide Mazzanti

The following is the Japanese roster in the 2019 FIVB Volleyball Women's Nations League 

Head coach: Kumi Nakada

The following is the Dutch roster in the 2019 FIVB Volleyball Women's Nations League 

Head coach:  Jamie Morrison

The following is the German roster in the 2019 FIVB Volleyball Women's Nations League 

Head coach: Jacek Nawrocki

The following is the Russian roster in the 2019 FIVB Volleyball Women's Nations League 

Head coach: Alexander Krasilnikov

The following is the Serbian roster in the 2019 FIVB Volleyball Women's Nations League 

Head coach: Zoran Terzić

The following is the Korean roster in the 2019 FIVB Volleyball Women's Nations League.

Head coach:  Stefano Lavarini

The following is the Thai roster in the 2019 FIVB Volleyball Women's Nations League. 
Head coach: Danai Sriwatcharamethakul

The following is the Turkish roster in the 2019 FIVB Volleyball Women's Nations League 

Head coach:  Giovanni Guidetti

The following is the American roster in the 2019 FIVB Volleyball Women's Nations League 

Head coach: Karch Kiraly

References

External links
Official website

2019
2019 in women's volleyball